Rainbow (Waiānuenue) Falls is a waterfall located in Hilo, Hawaii. The falls are part of the Hawai'i State Parks. There is no fee to see the falls.

At Rainbow (Waiānuenue) Falls, the Wailuku River rushes into a large pool below. The gorge is blanketed by lush, dense nonnative tropical rainforest and the turquoise-colored pool is bordered by beautiful, although nonnative, wild ginger. Monstera is also in abundance.  The falls are accessible via Wailuku River State Park, Waiānuenue Avenue, coordinates , and are best seen from the park's viewing platform.

Known in the Hawaiian language as Waiānuenue (literally "rainbow water"), the falls flows over a natural lava cave, the mythological home to Hina, an ancient Hawaiian goddess.

Rainbow Falls derives its name from the fact that, on sunny mornings around 10am, rainbows can be seen in the mist thrown up by the waterfall.

See also
 List of Hawaii state parks
 Akaka Falls
 Umauma Falls

References

External links

Wailuku River state park official website

State parks of Hawaii
Waterfalls of Hawaii (island)
Hilo, Hawaii